Beaumont Street is a major street in Hamilton Newcastle, Australia running from the Islington antiques district on Maitland Road to Henry Park in Hamilton South. While the southernmost end of the street is primarily residential, the stretch between Tudor and Donald Streets is Newcastle's version of "Little Italy", and a significant site for the Italian community in Newcastle. A walking tour of Hamilton can help you explore the local area, shops, cafes and restaurants.

See also

Visit Newcastle

References 

Newcastle, New South Wales
Roads in the Hunter Region